Andreescu is a family name common in Romania and may refer to:

Anghel Andreescu (born 1950), Romanian general
Bianca Andreescu (born 2000), Canadian tennis player
Gabriel Andreescu (born 1952), Romanian human rights activist and political scientist
Ion Andreescu (1850–1882), Romanian painter
Mihail Andreescu-Skeletty (1882–1965), Romanian composer
Titu Andreescu (born 1956), Romanian-American mathematician

Romanian-language surnames
Patronymic surnames
Surnames from given names